Yuri Vladimirovich Trushin (born 14 August 1945 in Leningrad) is Russian physicist and professor of Theoretical Physics of semiconductors. He is a member of the Russian Academy of Natural Sciences, and has been recognized as an Honored Scientist of the Russian Federation.

Biography
 1945 — born in Leningrad.
 1969 — graduated from the Department of Physics at Leningrad State University (chair for Quantum Mechanics), and started his career in the Krylov State Research Center. 
 Since 1974 — has been working at the Ioffe Institute, presently he is a chief scientist in the Department of theoretical microelectronics.
 1975 — defended his Ph.D. thesis "Theory of radiation cascades in solid state" at Leningrad Polytechnical Institute.
 1989 — defended his Doktor nauk (D.Sci.) thesis "Theory of radiation processes in solid solutions in various phases of dissociation" at Moscow Institute of Electronic Machine Building (MIEM), specialization in solid-state physics.
 Since 1991 — has been working as a professor in the Department of Nanotechnology at Saint Petersburg State Polytechnical University.
 Since 2004 — has been working as an academic secretary in the Department for Physics of Condensed Matter and Nanotechnology, and a chief scientist in the Nanotechnology Laboratory at Saint Petersburg Academic University, simultaneously with his employments at the Ioffe Institute and at the Polytechnical University.
 2004 — was elected to full membership in the Russian Academy of Natural Sciences (corresponding membership since 1999).
 2008 — was awarded a title "Honored Scientist of the Russian Federation".

Research activity 
Trushin's research interests include theory and computer modeling of physical processes, kinetics and evolution of structural defects, as well as radiation impact in multi-component crystalline materials, such as metals, semiconductors, and high-temperature materials.

He has written several books and over 250 papers published in peer-reviewed journals, Hirsch index is 11.

Served as an editorial board member of the Technical Physics Journal.

Published books
Yu.V. Trushin. Problems of modern energetics. (in Russian) Leningrad, 1982, Znanie, 16 pp. 
A.N. Orlov, Yu.V. Trushin. Point defect energies in metals. (in Russian) Moscow: Energoatomisdat, 1983, 81 pp.
V.V. Kirsanov, A.L. Suvorov, Yu.V. Trushin. Processes of radiation defect formation in metals. (in Russian) Moscow: Energoatomisdat, 1985, 222 pp.
S.N. Romanov, Yu.V. Trushin, V.I. Shtan'ko. Computer modeling of radiation processes in solid state bodies. (in Russian) Methodical directions. LTI im. Lensoveta, Leningrad, 1988, 40 pp.
Yu.V. Trushin. Theory of radiation processes in metal solid solutions. New York, Nova Science Publishers, Inc. 1996, 405 pp.
Yu.V. Trushin. Course of physical basis of radiation material science. (in Russian) SPb TU, 1996, 80 pp.
Yu.V. Trushin. Physical Material Science. (Textbook for Technical Universities) (in Russian) St.Petersburg: Nauka, 2000, 286 pp.
Yu.V. Trushin.  Radiation processes in multicomponent materials (theory and computer modeling). (in Russian) St.Petersburg: Ioffe Physical Technical Institute, 2002, 384 pp. 
Yu.V. Trushin. Essays about history of physics of first half of XX century. Part.1. Becoming of quantum mechanics – basis of modern physics. (Textbook for Technical Universities) (in Russian) Academic University, series “Lectures in Academic University”, vol.2, St.Petersburg, 2012, 324 pp.
Yu.V. Trushin. Physical Material Science (Textbook for Technical Universities) (in Russian) Academic University, series “Lectures in Academic University”, vol.3, St.Petersburg, 2012, 356 pp.

References

1945 births
Living people
Russian physicists
Scientists from Saint Petersburg